Nikša Petrović (born 27 January 1992) is a Croatian football midfielder, who played for Osijek in the Prva HNL.

Hi career with Osijek was ruined however by persisting knee injuries.

References

External links

Nikša Petrović at Sportnet.hr 
 

1992 births
Living people
Sportspeople from Osijek
Association football midfielders
Croatian footballers
Croatia youth international footballers
NK Osijek players
Croatian Football League players